Catherine Anne O'Hara  (born March 4, 1954) is a Canadian-American actress. She is known for her comedy work on Second City Television (1976–84) and Schitt's Creek (2015–2020) and in films such as After Hours (1985), Beetlejuice (1988), Home Alone (1990), Home Alone 2: Lost in New York (1992), and The Nightmare Before Christmas (1993). Her other film appearances include the mockumentary films written and directed by Christopher Guest; Waiting for Guffman (1996), Best in Show (2000), A Mighty Wind (2003), and For Your Consideration (2006). 

O'Hara won the 1982 Primetime Emmy Award for Outstanding Writing for a Variety Series for SCTV Network, the Genie Award for Best Supporting Actress for the 1999 film The Life Before This, and was nominated for an Emmy Award for the 2010 television film Temple Grandin. From 2015 to 2020, she starred as Moira Rose on the CBC sitcom Schitt's Creek, for which she won a Primetime Emmy Award, Golden Globe Award, Screen Actors Guild Award, TCA Award and six consecutive Canadian Screen Awards.

Early life
O'Hara was born in 1954 and grew up in Toronto, Ontario, the sixth of seven children. She is of Irish descent, and was raised Catholic.

Career
O'Hara started her comedy career in 1974 as a cast member of The Second City in her hometown, Toronto. She was an understudy for Gilda Radner until Radner left for Saturday Night Live. Two years later, this theatre troupe created the sketch comedy show SCTV, for which O'Hara became a regular performer.

In the late 1970s, she provided voice-overs for a number of cartoons, work which would continue throughout her career. During a short time in the early 1980s when SCTV was in between network deals, she was hired to replace Ann Risley when Saturday Night Live was being retooled in 1981. However, she quit the show without ever appearing on air, choosing to go back to SCTV when the show signed on with NBC.

O'Hara began her career on television, apart from SCTV, in the mid-1970s. She first appeared on television in a small sketch role as a maid in a 1975 Wayne and Shuster special on CBC. Later, she appeared in the 1976 television film The Rimshots, the children's television series Coming Up Rosie for a season (1976–77), and television specials, such as Witch's Night Out and Intergalactic Thanksgiving. But it was her performances on SCTV, which began airing locally in Southern Ontario in the fall of 1976, that earned her fame in Canada. The show gradually built up a national and then international following in syndication. O'Hara left SCTV for a time, missing the 1980-81 season, but returned to the show in time for its pickup by the NBC television network in the US, when it became known as SCTV Network 90. O'Hara's work as a writer on the show earned her an Emmy Award for outstanding writing and two Emmy Award nominations. She left SCTV again prior to its fifth season in 1982, but did return for occasional guest appearances though the show's end in 1984.

O'Hara has appeared in a number of television series and television films and continues to work in television. During the 1990s, she made guest appearances on Tales from the Crypt, Oh Baby, Morton & Hayes and The Larry Sanders Show. She served as actress and director on Dream On and The Outer Limits, the revival of the '60s series of the same name. O'Hara has guest-starred on top-rated television series including Six Feet Under and Curb Your Enthusiasm. In May 2008, it was announced that she had signed on to star in the upcoming ABC dramedy Good Behavior. Her role in the 2010 television film Temple Grandin earned her three award nominations: a Primetime Emmy Award, a Satellite Award, and a Screen Actors Guild Award.

O'Hara has also had a successful career in film. She made her feature debut in the 1980 film Double Negative, which also starred her SCTV co-stars John Candy, Eugene Levy, and Joe Flaherty. Throughout the 1980s and 1990s, O'Hara appeared in many supporting roles, including Martin Scorsese's After Hours (1985) and Heartburn (1986), with Meryl Streep. She appeared in movies like Beetlejuice (1988) and Lemony Snicket's A Series of Unfortunate Events (2004), as well as the blockbuster Home Alone (1990) and its sequel Home Alone 2: Lost in New York (1992). Also in 1992, O'Hara worked alongside Jeff Daniels in the comedy There Goes the Neighborhood.

O'Hara continued to appear in many films during the 1990s and the beginning of the 21st century. She received roles in four of Christopher Guest's mockumentary films, three of which earned her awards and nominations: Waiting for Guffman (1996), Best in Show (2000), A Mighty Wind (2003), and For Your Consideration (2006). Her role in 1999's The Life Before This won her a Genie Award for Best Performance by an Actress in a Supporting Role. She also appeared in the tenth series of the UK version of Whose Line Is It Anyway? In 2006, she starred with Christina Ricci in the fantasy film Penelope.

O'Hara has served as a voice artist in a number of animated movies, including The Nightmare Before Christmas (1993), Bartok the Magnificent (1999), Chicken Little (2005), Over the Hedge (2006), Monster House (2006), Brother Bear 2 (2006), Frankenweenie (2012), and The Addams Family (2019).

From 2015 to 2020, O'Hara starred alongside Eugene Levy, whom she met on the set of Second City Television, as Moira Rose in the CBC sitcom Schitt's Creek. Her performance earned her six Canadian Screen Awards for Best Lead Actress in a Comedy Series. She swept the 5 major tv awards for the 6th and final season, winning a TCA Award for Individual Achievement in Comedy, a Primetime Emmy Award for Outstanding Lead Actress in a Comedy Series, a Golden Globe Award for Best Actress – Television Series Musical or Comedy, a Critics' Choice Television Award for Best Actress in a Comedy Series, and a Screen Actors Guild Award for Outstanding Performance by a Female Actor in a Comedy Series.

She also appeared as Dr. Georgina Orwell in the first season of the Netflix black comedy drama series A Series of Unfortunate Events, which premiered in 2017. Two of her episodes were directed by her husband Bo Welch who also served as production designer for the series. She was the only cast member from the 2004 film adaptation to be re-cast in the TV series as well.

She appears on the revival of another Canadian sketch comedy staple The Kids in the Hall, in its second episode as Charlene, a Friend of the Kids in the Hall.

Celebrities impersonated on SCTV

Tammy Faye Bakker
Lucille Ball
Candice Bergen
Karen Black
Linda Blair
Rona Barrett
Barbara Billingsley
Lynda Carter
Julia Child
Joan Crawford
Angie Dickinson
Joan Embery

Morgan Fairchild
Mary Tyler Moore
Jane Fonda
Phyllis George
Katharine Hepburn
Rickie Lee Jones
Diane Keaton
Dorothy Kilgallen
Jane Pauley
Gilda Radner
Charlotte Rampling

Jessica Savitch
Brooke Shields
Dinah Shore
Maggie Smith
Meryl Streep
Joan Sutherland
Elizabeth Taylor
Margaret Thatcher
Liv Ullmann
Monica Vitti
Rusty Warren

Personal life
In 1983, O'Hara told Rolling Stone, "I'm pretty much a good Catholic girl at heart." O'Hara met production designer Bo Welch on the set of Beetlejuice. They married in 1992 and have two sons, Matthew (born 1994) and Luke (born 1997). Her sister is singer-songwriter Mary Margaret O'Hara; Catherine is a singer-songwriter in her own right, having written and performed songs in Christopher Guest's film A Mighty Wind. She holds dual U.S. and Canadian citizenship.

O’Hara was named honorary mayor of Brentwood for 2021.
She has situs inversus.

Filmography

Films

Television

Television films

Awards and nominations

O'Hara was selected for the inaugural 2021 Forbes 50 Over 50; made up of entrepreneurs, leaders, scientists and creators who are over the age of 50.

O'Hara is also referenced in the Bran Van 3000 song "Supermodel" from their 1996 album Glee.

In January 2023, she was named the winner of the Academy of Canadian Cinema and Television's Icon Award at the 11th Canadian Screen Awards.

References

External links

Catherine O'Hara at Northernstars.ca

1954 births
20th-century Canadian actresses
20th-century Canadian comedians
20th-century Roman Catholics
21st-century American actresses
21st-century American comedians
21st-century Canadian actresses
21st-century Canadian comedians
21st-century Roman Catholics
Actresses from Toronto
American film actresses
American people of Irish descent
American Roman Catholics
American sketch comedians
American television actresses
American television hosts
American voice actresses
American women comedians
American women television presenters
Audiobook narrators
Best Actress in a Comedy Series Canadian Screen Award winners
Best Musical or Comedy Actress Golden Globe (television) winners
Best Supporting Actress Genie and Canadian Screen Award winners
Canadian Comedy Award winners
Canadian emigrants to the United States
Canadian film actresses
Canadian people of Irish descent
Canadian Roman Catholics
Canadian sketch comedians
Canadian television actresses
Canadian television hosts
Canadian television writers
Canadian voice actresses
Canadian women comedians
Canadian women screenwriters
Canadian women television hosts
Comedians from Toronto
Living people
Officers of the Order of Canada
Outstanding Performance by a Female Actor in a Comedy Series Screen Actors Guild Award winners
Outstanding Performance by a Lead Actress in a Comedy Series Primetime Emmy Award winners
People with acquired American citizenship
Canadian women television writers
Writers from Toronto